Conga players perform on a tall, narrow, single-headed Cuban drum of African origin called the Tumbadora, or the Conga as it is internationally known. It is  probably derived from the Congolese Makuta drums or Sikulu drums commonly played in Mbanza Ngungu, Congo.

Originally a person who plays tumbadoras is called a "tumbador" but ever since they began using the name "conga", a man who plays conga is called a "conguero" and a woman who plays conga is called "conguera".  Other common terms are "timbero" and "timbera", or "rumbero" and "rumbera" if one plays congas in rumba setting.

Although ultimately derived from African drums made from hollowed logs, the Cuban conga can be staved from ribs like a barrel, or shaped from one solid piece like a hollowed log.  Some are now made from fiberglass or other synthetic materials.

Congas were originally made from salvaged rum or wine barrels and locally-available animal skins. Modern congas may have synthetic (or hybrid fiber-plastic) or natural skins.

They were used both in Afro-Caribbean religious music and as the principal instrument in Rumba. Congas are now very common in Latin American music, including salsa music, as well as many other forms of American popular music.

Originally it was played only using one drum; now it is common to see two, three, or four drums. Some congueros such as Giovanni Hidalgo play up to six or seven drums.

Cuban
Chano Pozo
Carlos Vidal Bolado
Miguelito Valdés
Carlos "Patato" Valdes
Tata Güines
Armando Peraza
Candido Camero
Julito Collazo
Luis Abreu
Los Muñequitos de Matanzas
Mongo Santamaría
Francisco Aguabella
Pancho Quinto
José Luis "Changuito" Quintana
Miguel "Angá" Díaz
Luis Conte
Eliel Lazo
Roberto Vizcaíno
Mauricio Herrera

Cuban American
Desi Arnaz
Fermin Goytisolo
Walfredo Reyes, Jr.
Daniel de los Reyes
Johnny Conga

Puerto Rican
Ray Barretto
Joe Cuba
Milton Cardona
Jerry González
Ray Mantilla
Marc Quiñones
Lenny Castro
Michael Carabello
Frank Colón
Eddie Montalvo
Marcel Rodriguez-Lopez
Roger Dawson
John Santos
Sammy Figueroa
Giovanni Hidalgo

British 

 Ray Cooper

African American
Papa Dee Allen
Eddie "Bongo" Brown
Eric "Bobo" Correa
"Master" Henry Gibson
Philip Bailey
Bobbye Hall Porter

Mexican-American
Pete Escovedo
Sheila E
Marcos Reyes
Poncho Sanchez

Italian American
Jack Costanzo
Joe Lala

American
Bob Conti
Raul Rekow

Peruvian
Alex Acuña

Brazilian
Rubens Bassini
Paulinho da Costa
Laudir de Oliveira
Guilherme Franco

Haitian
Ti Roro

Italian
Tony Esposito

Danish
Safri Duo

Venezuelan 

 Orlando Poleo

 Luisito Quintero
 Roberto Quintero
 Nené Vásquez
 Gerardo Rosales
 Pibo Márquez
 Martha Paredes
 Patatín Guacarán

See also

Lists of musicians

References

External links

 Introduction to the Conga Drum at the Drum Dojo.
online community for conga and other world percussion
Hand Drumming at Wikiot.com - A wiki devoted to music.  Contains some Conga lessons and videos.

 
Conga